The name America Now may refer to:
America Now, an American syndicated television program that debuted in 2010
The Buck Sexton Show, a syndicated radio talk show formerly titled America Now
Kudlow & Cramer, a CNBC program formerly titled America Now
America Now: the Anthropology of a Changing Culture, a 1981 book by Marvin Harris republished in 1987 as Why Nothing Works: The Anthropology of Daily Life